Bruce Alan Brown (December 1, 1937 – December 10, 2017) was an American documentary film director, known as an early pioneer of the surf film. He was the father of filmmaker Dana Brown.

Biography
Brown's films include Slippery When Wet (1958), Surf Crazy (1959), Barefoot Adventure (1960), Surfing Hollow Days (1961), Waterlogged (1962), and his best known film, The Endless Summer (1964), which received nationwide theatrical release in 1966. Considered among the most influential in the genre, The Endless Summer follows surfers Mike Hynson and Robert August around the world. Thirty years later, in 1994 Brown filmed The Endless Summer II with his son Dana.

He also made a number of short films including The Wet Set, featuring the Hobie-MacGregor Sportswear Surf Team and one of the earliest skateboarding films, America's Newest Sport, presenting the Hobie Super Surfer Skateboard Team. These short films, along with some unused footage from The Endless Summer, were included in the DVD Surfin' Shorts, as part of the Golden Years of Surf collection. Brown went beyond surfing a few times with films about motorcycle sport, On Any Sunday (1971), which is held in high regard as one of the best motorcycle documentaries of all time, On Any Sunday II (1981), Baja 1000 Classic (1991), and On Any Sunday: Revisited (2000). He made a guest appearance in the SpongeBob SquarePants episode "SpongeBob SquarePants vs. The Big One". 

In 2003, together with Alex Mecl, Brown revived Bruce Brown Films, LLC with the intent of protecting Brown's legacy and intellectual property, including his trademarks, copyrights, and vast film archives. The company continues to carry on Bruce Brown's legacy while serving the many loyal fans worldwide.

Brown died of natural causes in Santa Barbara, California, nine days after his 80th birthday.

Posthumous documentary
After the death of Brown's wife and filmmaking partner Patricia in 2006, he went into a depression, unable to leave his home. This was a significant change from his previously very active lifestyle. His children, including the eldest, filmmaker Dana Brown, embarked on a camper road trip with the senior Brown to reconnect him with the groundbreaking surfers that had been his friends and compatriots since the 1950s. The trip was filmed, capturing Bruce Brown's return to joy. 

Originally planned as a series of webisodes, after Bruce Brown's death the project became a feature-length film, ultimately titled A Life of Endless Summers: The Bruce Brown Story. It was completed in 2020 and featured in the Newport Beach Film Festival's shortened season that August. Due to Covid restrictions, the film was shown at a makeshift drive-in theater at a local mall. The film went on to limited release in a number of film festivals in surfing Meccas.

Awards and honors

Inducted into the AMA Motorcycle Hall of Fame in 1999.

A 2009 inductee into the Surfers' Hall of Fame in Huntington Beach, California.

 On 19 September 2019, a statue of Bruce Brown at Waterman Plaza on Pacific Coast Highway in Dana Point joins memorials to Hobie Alter and Phil Edwards.

References

External links

1937 births
2017 deaths
American surfers
American documentary filmmakers
Motorcycling mass media people
People from San Francisco